Chinemesa is a little-known genus of thread-legged bug (Emesinae) apparently endemic to Borneo. Only four species have been described and the three described by Wygodzinsky in 1966 have not been observed since.

Species list

Chinemesa feminata Wygodzinsky, 1966
Chinemesa murudiana Wygodzinsky, 1966
Chinemesa poiana Wygodzinsky, 1966
Chinemesa uniannulata Redei, 2007

References

Reduviidae
Cimicomorpha genera
Insects of Borneo